Oscar Midtlyng (31 August 1906 – 29 October 1994) was a Norwegian athlete. He competed in the men's high jump at the 1928 Summer Olympics.

References

External links
 

1906 births
1994 deaths
Athletes (track and field) at the 1928 Summer Olympics
Norwegian male high jumpers
Olympic athletes of Norway
Place of birth missing